STUHA (Studentské hnutí – a Czech student movement; also the Czech word for 'ribbon') was an alternative, independent student movement in the late phase of the Czechoslovak Communist régime. It was gradually formed by Prague students in the late spring and early summer of 1989. The movement was the catalyst that mobilized the university students, later culminating in the demonstration and march at Albertov, Prague, and then on to the city centre, on 17 November 1989.

History

The Stuha movement was formed in summer 1989, largely at the initiative of former classmates of a technical school (Střední Průmyslová škola strojnická Praha), in Betlémská ulice, Prague: Marek Benda and Jiří Dienstbier Jr. Other now well-known figures who took part in the formation of the group were Šimon Pánek and Jan Vidím. The aim of the movement was to push for visible democratic change in the Communist régime. With the collapse of the régime following the demonstrations, and with the emergence of new problems and topics and the dramatic differentiation of the new situation, the work of Stuha gradually lost importance and eventually came to a halt in the early weeks of 1990. The differentiation of the politics and ideologies of the main actors, as well as their getting involved in specific political activities, also led to the winding down of the movement. Three of the main founders soon became deputies to the new Federal Assembly (the Czechoslovak parliament). 

Before that the leading figures of the STUHA movement had met on 9 November 1989 (the day the great 19th century Czech poet, Karel Hynek Mácha, is traditionally commemorated at his monument in Petřín park, Prague), with the aim of getting in touch with the leaders of the Socialist Youth Organization (Socialistický svaz mládeže – SSM) and winning over SSM members who were willing to take part in a mass demonstration for democratization of the régime. This new strategy became the source of conflict within Stuha, but was ultimately pushed through and contributed importantly to the success of the movement for democratic change.

It was very likely STUHA that had considerable influence on the course of events during the student march from Albertov up the hill to the Vyšehrad national cemetery and then, without permission, to the centre of Prague on the evening of 17 November 1989. And it is probably the moderation of this determined group that was reflected in the character and course of the first phase of the public demonstrations and their gradual radicalization. In November 1989, the secret police considered the activity of the Stuha movement to be very important and rather dangerous to the régime. The secret police monitored the role and work of Jiří Dienstbier Jr., Marek Benda, and Ladislav Lis, in organizing and moderating the demonstration at Albertov.

Aims and achievements
Among the important work of the STUHA movement was the awakening of the student body and its interest in civil liberties, human rights, and genuine democratization of the country. The aim was also to create another link between the dissident movement and students of what has popularly been called the 'grey zone' (people who did not support the régime but who did not openly come out against it).

References

Further reading
Timothy Garton Ash, We the People: The Revolution of ’89, Witnessed in Warsaw, Budapest, Berlin and Prague (Cambridge Granta Books 1990). s. 64 (Chapter Prague Laterna Magica)
 Kukral, Michael Andrew. Prague 1989: Theater of Revolution. New York: Columbia University Press. 1997. .
 Tauchen, Jaromír – Schelle, Karel etc.: The Process of Democratization of Law in the Czech Republic (1989–2009). Rincon (USA), The American Institute for Central European Legal Studies 2009. 204 pp. .
 Williams, Kieran, 'Civil Resistance in Czechoslovakia: From Soviet Invasion to "Velvet Revolution", 1968–89,' in Adam Roberts and Timothy Garton Ash (eds.), Civil Resistance and Power Politics: The Experience of Non-violent Action from Gandhi to the Present. Oxford & New York: Oxford University Press, 2009. .
Praha, Univerzum 1990. .

External links

 Velvet Revolution on web project of Institute of Contemporary History, Prague Detailed documentation, textual and visual, of the Velvet Revolution partly in English.
 The Velvet Philosophical Revolution, City Journal, Winter 2010
 Velvet Revolution on totalita.cz Detailed day-to-day history with key documents quoted (in Czech only). Shortened version was used as a source for Chronology above.
 Velvet Revolution on Prague-life A shortened version of the Velvet Revolution.
 "In the footsteps of November 17" – Czech.cz
 After the Velvet, the Existential Revolution? dialogue between Václav Havel and Adam Michnik, English, salon.eu.sk, November 2008
 The Velvet Oratorio An oratorio based on the events of the Velvet Revolution
 Velvet Revolution Diary English translation of an authentic diary of a student participating in the revolution plus scans of US articles from that time
 PDF, zpráva Czechoslovak secret-police report on the student demonstration Albertov 17 November 1989 (in Czech)

Organizations of the Revolutions of 1989
Velvet Revolution
Nonviolent revolutions
Democratization
Protests
20th-century revolutions